"The Happy Wanderer" is the 19th episode of the HBO original series The Sopranos and the sixth of the show's second season. It was written by Frank Renzulli, directed by John Patterson, and originally aired on February 20, 2000.

Starring
 James Gandolfini as Tony Soprano
 Lorraine Bracco as Dr. Jennifer Melfi 
 Edie Falco as Carmela Soprano
 Michael Imperioli as Christopher Moltisanti
 Dominic Chianese as Junior Soprano
 Vincent Pastore as Salvatore "Big Pussy" Bonpensiero
 Steven Van Zandt as Silvio Dante
 Tony Sirico as Paulie Gualtieri
 Robert Iler as A.J. Soprano
 Jamie-Lynn Sigler as Meadow Soprano
 Drea de Matteo as Adriana La Cerva
 David Proval as Richie Aprile 
 Aida Turturro as Janice Soprano
 Nancy Marchand as Livia Soprano

Guest starring
 John Ventimiglia as Artie Bucco

Also guest starring

Synopsis
Tony tells Dr. Melfi that he is angry with everybody, but doesn't know why; he wants to hit her, and the happy-looking people he sees in the street. He despises the weaklings who run to psychiatrists and tells her, as he has told her before, that he admires the strong, silent type, like Gary Cooper.

Tony is told by Uncle Junior that he and Tony's father had another brother, Ercole, long dead, who was, in Junior's words, "slow". He also tells him that his father left a "package" of money to his mother. Tony is uncomfortable when he sees his mother at a funeral and later at Meadow's high-school cabaret night.

An old school friend of Tony's, David (Davey) Scatino, owns a sporting goods store. His son, Eric, is a classmate of Meadow's and they are going to sing a duet at the school's cabaret night, although Meadow asks to perform a solo instead.

Davey is a compulsive gambler — he owes Richie Aprile $8,000 and has been banned from Richie's small poker game until the debt has been paid.  Tony has taken over the high-stakes "Executive Game" from Junior, who is under house arrest. Davey asks Tony to let him play in it but he refuses, saying, "These people play deep." The game begins at the motel Tony's crew has taken over. Davey knocks at the door and again tries to persuade Tony to let him play. After a few moments' thought Tony agrees and loans him $5,000. Davey initially wins and the game goes on through the night while Tony is asleep.

Tony wakes in the morning and is told by Christopher that Davey is down $45,000 after talking his way into more loans. Richie comes to the room, sees Davey playing, and chokes him, breaking up the game. For this act of disrespect, Tony tells Richie that he is not permitted to collect his debt from Davey until Tony has collected his. Davey attempts to talk to Tony as a friend but Tony rebuffs him. Janice tells Richie he has a right to stand up to Tony.

When Davey misses the first deadline for payment, Tony goes to his office at the store and beats him. Davey finds a pretext to take Eric's SUV away from him and gives it to Tony as partial payment. Tony presents it to Meadow, but she realizes it was Eric's car and tearfully rejects it. At the cabaret night, Eric refuses at the last minute to perform with her and walks out, leaving Meadow to perform a solo as she had always hoped.

First appearances
 Vito Spatafore: Richie Aprile's nephew, who is also in his crew.
 David Scatino: Tony's childhood friend and compulsive gambler.
 Dr. Ira Fried: A player in the Executive Game and doctor specialized in treating erectile dysfunction. Also performs emergency surgeries for mob-related injuries.

Deceased
 Tom Giglione, Sr.: Tony's brother-in-law's father, who died after falling off a roof.

Title reference
 The episode's title refers to a "happy wanderer", a person who walks around with no worries in the world, whom Tony despises.

Production
 Though this is Joseph R. Gannascoli's first appearance as Vito, he previously had appeared briefly as Gino, a bakery customer, in a scene during the first season episode, "The Legend of Tennessee Moltisanti." He would not be credited as a main cast member until Season 6. 
 Tony Sirico's real-life older brother Carmine appears as the nameless "Dealer" in Aprile's small-stakes poker game. His few words of dialogue are spoken off camera.

Cultural references
 Junior says Ercole was a derivation of Hercules, and that Ercole was strong like a bull and handsome like George Raft.
 Silvio becomes increasingly agitated during a losing night of poker, finally explodes after Matt Bevilaqua sweeps up crumbs near him, and yells at Tony: "I'm losin' my balls over here. This fuckin' moron's playing Hazel?" Hazel was a hit 1960s TV show starring Shirley Booth as a maid.
 When Eric Scatino opts out of performing the "Sun and Moon" duet with Meadow, the emcee announces that Meadow will, instead, sing the solo "My Heart Will Go On", from the 1997 film Titanic. Also, during the "Executive Game" of poker, Paulie makes a joke about Viagra being used to "raise" the real Titanic. Tony once again mentions his role model, actor Gary Cooper, to Dr. Melfi.

Music
  The song sung by Gudren, the blonde soprano, after Meadow and Eric's on-stage rehearsal and again at the beginning of the concert, is "Gretchen am Spinnrade" by Franz Schubert.
 The Muzak version of "Spinning Wheel" by Blood, Sweat, & Tears is playing in the store when Richie comes to collect payment from Davey. Paulie later misquotes this song in the season six episode Stage 5.
 When Eric picks up Meadow, he is listening to "Down" by Stone Temple Pilots.
 The duet that Meadow and Eric are practicing is "Sun and Moon" from the musical Miss Saigon''.
 The song "Love Is Strange" by Mickey & Sylvia is playing in the background when Davey goes to Artie's restaurant seeking a loan from him.
 The song "Tequila Sunrise" by Eagles is playing in the store when Tony goes to collect his first payment from Davey.
 The song played over the closing credits is a version of "The Happy Wanderer" sung by Frankie Yankovic.

Filming locations 
Listed in order of first appearance:

 Clifton High School in Clifton, New Jersey
 Washington Middle School in Harrison, New Jersey
 Ramsey Outdoor in Paramus, New Jersey
 Newark, New Jersey
 Wayne, New Jersey
 Fair Lawn, New Jersey
 North Caldwell, New Jersey
 Belleville, New Jersey
 Long Island City, Queens

Awards
James Gandolfini won his first Primetime Emmy Award for Outstanding Lead Actor in a Drama Series for his performance in this episode.

References

External links
"The Happy Wanderer"  at HBO

The Sopranos (season 2) episodes
2000 American television episodes
Television episodes directed by John Patterson (director)

fr:Le Vagabond heureux